China Railway Kunming Group, officially abbreviated as CR Kunming or CR-Kunming, formerly, Kunming Railway Administration is a subsidiaries company under the jurisdiction of the China Railway (formerly the Ministry of Railway). It supervises the railway network within Yunnan. The railway administration was reorganized as a company in November 2017.

Hub stations
 Kunming
 ,

References

Rail transport in Yunnan
China Railway Corporation